Pauline Amos  is an artist.

At her 'My Flesh My Canvas' performance in London, viewers were invited to paint on her unclothed body.

After a 24-hour performance in the Opera Paese gallery in Rome, Amos offered the resulting painting for sale at the Home House Members Club in London, with an asking price of £1.3m.

References

Living people
Year of birth missing (living people)
British women artists